A blue dwarf is a predicted class of star that develops from a red dwarf after it has exhausted much of its hydrogen fuel supply. Because red dwarfs fuse their hydrogen slowly and are fully convective (allowing their entire hydrogen supply to be fused, instead of merely that in the core), they are predicted to have lifespans of trillions of years; the Universe is currently not old enough for any blue dwarfs to have formed yet; their future existence is predicted based on theoretical models.

Hypothetical scenario
Stars increase in luminosity as they age, and a more luminous star needs to radiate energy more quickly to maintain equilibrium. Stars larger than red dwarfs do this by increasing their size and becoming red giants with larger surface areas. Rather than expanding, however, red dwarfs with less than 0.25 solar masses are predicted to increase their radiative rate by increasing their surface temperatures and becoming "bluer". This is because the surface layers of red dwarfs do not become significantly more opaque with increasing temperature.

Despite their name, blue dwarfs do not necessarily increase in temperature enough to become blue stars. Simulations have been conducted on the future evolution of red dwarfs with stellar mass between 0.06  and 0.25 .
Of the masses simulated, the bluest of the blue dwarf stars at the end of the simulation had begun as a 0.14  red dwarf, and ended with surface temperature approximately 8600 K, making it a type A blue-white star.

End of stellar life
Blue dwarfs are believed to eventually completely exhaust their store of hydrogen fuel, and their interior pressures are insufficient to fuse any other fuel. Once fusion ends, they are no longer main-sequence "dwarf" stars and become so-called white dwarfs – which, despite the name, are not main-sequence "dwarfs" and are not stars, but rather stellar remnants. 

Once the former "blue"-dwarf stars have become degenerate, non-stellar white dwarfs, they cool, losing the remnant heat left over from their final hydrogen-fusing stage. The cooling process also requires enormous periods of time – much longer than the age of the universe at present – similar to the immense time previously required for them to change from their original red dwarf stage to their final blue dwarf stage. The stellar remnant white dwarf will eventually cool to become a black dwarf. (The universe is not old enough for any stellar remnants to have cooled to "black", so black dwarfs are also a well-founded, but still hypothetical object.)

See also
Lists of stars

References
 

Hypothetical stars
Stellar evolution